Hugh, Count of Brienne and Lecce ( 1240 – 9 August 1296) was the second surviving son of Count Walter IV of Brienne and Marie de Lusignan of Cyprus.

Life
His father, Count of Jaffa and Ascalon in Palestine, was murdered in 1244 in Cairo, and was succeeded by his eldest son, John.

On John's death (c. 1260), Hugh inherited the County of Brienne in France and the family's claims in southern Italy, including the Principality of Taranto and the County of Lecce, which had been confiscated in 1205.

He claimed the regency of the Kingdom of Jerusalem (and indirectly a place in the succession) in 1264 as senior heir to Alice of Jerusalem and Hugh I of Cyprus, being the son of their eldest daughter, but was passed over by the Haute Cour in favour of his cousin Hugh of Antioch and thereafter took little part in the affairs of Outremer. His first cousin, King Hugh II of Cyprus, died in 1267 and despite Hugh's rights as senior heir, Hugh of Antioch was crowned Hugh III of Cyprus. When his second cousin's son Conradin, King of Jerusalem, was killed in 1268, the succession passed again to his junior cousin Hugh III.

Deciding to seek his fortune in Europe rather than Outremer, Hugh entered the service of Charles I of Naples. Charles made him Captain-General of Brindisi, Otranto and Apulia and Lord of Conversano, and he was an enthusiastic partisan of the Angevin cause in Italy. For this service he was restored to his family's County of Lecce. He was captured with Charles II of Naples in the Battle of the Gulf of Naples in 1284 and again in the Battle of the Counts in 1287, both times in naval battles against Roger of Lauria. On one of these occasions he obtained his parole by leaving his only son Walter as a hostage. He was killed in Sicily, at the Battle of Gagliano, against the Catalan Almogavars, and was succeeded by Walter.

In 1291 he married Helena Angelina Komnene, widow of William de la Roche, Duke of Athens, and regent for her underage son Guy II de la Roche. He thus became Bailli of the Duchy of Athens until Guy II came of age in 1296.

Marriages and issue
Hugh's first wife was Isabella de la Roche, heiress of Thebes. They had a son, Walter V (d. 1311), who succeeded Hugh, and a daughter, Agnes, who married Count John of Joigny. Hugh and his second wife, Helena Angelina Komnene, had a daughter, Joanna, who married Duke Nicholas I Sanudo of Naxos.

Genealogical table

References

Sources
 
 

|-

|-

1240 births
1296 deaths
Year of birth uncertain
13th-century people of the Kingdom of Jerusalem
13th-century viceregal rulers
Counts of Brienne
Counts of Lecce
Christians of the Crusades
French people of Cypriot descent
Military personnel killed in action
Regents of Jerusalem
House of Brienne
Barons of Karytaina
People from the Duchy of Athens
Prisoners and detainees of Aragon